The Paren is a river in northeastern Russia which drains in to the Penzhina Bay of the Sea of Okhotsk. There is a village along with the riverbank also named Paren.

See also
List of rivers of Russia

References

Rivers of Magadan Oblast
Rivers of Kamchatka Krai
Drainage basins of the Sea of Okhotsk